Wall of Fire is the second solo album by Canadian singer-songwriter Peter Elkas, produced by former Bob Dylan collaborator Charlie Sexton. It was released 20 March 2007 on MapleMusic Recordings.

Ron Sexsmith sings harmony vocals on the track "Willpower".

Track listing 

 "Fall Apart Again"
 "Willpower"
 "Paid Back"
 "Sweet Nancy"
 "Wall of Fire"
 "Darling See"
 "Something Beaming"
 "My Well Runs Deeper"
 "Sunlight"
 "See It with Me"

Peter Elkas albums
2007 albums